The St. Louis Wrestling Hall of Fame is a professional wrestling hall of fame. After several years of debating the idea of creating the Hall of Fame, former owner and promoter of the St. Louis Wrestling Club Larry Matysik opened it in 2007. He was joined in this effort by promoter Herb Simmons, SBAC Member Tony Casta, sports journalist Keith Schildroth, collector Mitch Hartsey, and longtime fan Nick Ridenour. Although these directors oversee the selection process, the St. Louis Wrestling Hall of Fame is unique because it is the only wrestling hall of fame that allows fans to vote for potential inductees.

The Hall of Fame was created to honor the role St. Louis played in helping to establish professional wrestling in North America. Matysik also wanted to create a hall of fame that recognized wrestlers for their contributions to wrestling rather than their relationships with the owner of the promotion. To be inducted into the Hall of Fame, inductees must have held a title belt or played an important role in or around the Missouri area between 1959 and 1983, when the National Wrestling Alliance (NWA) had a strong presence in St. Louis.

For the initial group of inductions, the directors decided that Sam Muchnick, Lou Thesz, Bill Longson, Mickey Garagiola, Penny Banner, and Joe Schoenberger would be inducted by acclamation. Fans were asked to vote for seven more inductees from a list of twenty choices. At the induction ceremony, these thirteen were enshrined, along with Matysik, a surprise inductee. King Kong Brody was inducted later that year.

When the Hall of Fame opened in 2007, it was located in The Pro Wrestling Shirt Shop, a business in St. Louis' South County Mall. It contained plaques and memorabilia from the St. Louis Wrestling Club. In 2008, the Hall was moved to the South Broadway Athletic Club. Each induction plaque is personalized with a description of the individual's contributions. For example, Thesz' plaque states that he is "the finest example of a true world champion". Six more people were inducted in 2008, bringing the total to twenty-one. The Hall's directors plan to add six more inductees each year. Fourteen men and one woman have been honored for their performance in the ring as wrestlers. The remaining six people have been inducted for their other contributions, including owning and promoting the St. Louis Wrestling Club, as well as performing duties as referees, ring announcers, and commentators.

Inductees

Current board members are Herb Simmons and Nick Ridenour.

 – This is the name given to him by his adoptive parents.

References

General
 
 
 
 
Specific

External links
Official website
St. Louis Wrestling Hall of Fame MySpace page

2007 establishments in the United States
Awards established in 2007
Professional wrestling halls of fame
Halls of fame in Missouri
Organizations based in St. Louis
Professional wrestling-related lists